The Ministry of Foreign Affairs and Cooperation (MFAC;) is the government department of East Timor accountable for foreign affairs.

Functions
The Ministry is responsible for the design, implementation, coordination and evaluation of policy for the following areas:

 foreign policy and international cooperation; and
 consular functions and the promotion and defense of the interests of Timorese citizens abroad.

History
The Ministry was created in 2002. Its headquarters, built with the assistance of Chinese funding, are located on Avenida Portugal in Dili.

Minister
The incumbent Minister of Foreign Affairs and Cooperation is Adaljíza Magno. She is assisted by Julião da Silva, Deputy Minister of Foreign Affairs and Cooperation.

See also 
 List of ministries of foreign affairs
 Politics of East Timor

References

Footnotes

Notes

External links

  – official site  (inactive )
 Government of East Timor
 
 Ministry of Foreign Affairs and Cooperation website archive - Library of Congress

East Timor
Foreign relations of East Timor
Foreign Affairs and Cooperation
East Timor, Foreign Affairs
1975 establishments in East Timor